Es (С с; italics: С с) is a letter of the Cyrillic script.

History
The Cyrillic letter Es is derived from a variant of the Greek letter Sigma known as lunate sigma (Ϲ ϲ), in use in the Greek-speaking world in early medieval times.

In the Cyrillic numeral system, Es had a value of 200.

Form
In the modern Latinized Cyrillic fonts in use today, the Cyrillic letter Es looks exactly like the Latin letter C, being one of six letters in the Cyrillic alphabet that share appearances with Latin alphabet letters but are pronounced differently (or at least differently from the most common pronunciation). This fact has been frequently abused by plagiarism detector circumventors.

Usage
As used in the alphabets of various languages, Es represents the following sounds:
palatalized voiceless alveolar fricative 

The pronunciations shown in the table are the primary ones for each language; for details consult the articles on the languages.

Related letters and other similar characters
Σ σ/ς : Greek letter Sigma
S s : Latin letter S
Ѕ ѕ : Cyrillic letter Ѕ
C c : Latin letter C

Computing codes

External links

References